This is a list of butterflies of Angola. About 510 species are known from Angola; 21 are endemic.

Papilionidae

Papilioninae

Papilionini
Papilio antimachus Drury, 1782
Papilio zalmoxis Hewitson, 1864
Papilio nireus Linnaeus, 1758
Papilio chrapkowskoides nurettini Koçak, 1983
Papilio sosia pulchra Berger, 1950
Papilio cynorta Fabricius, 1793
Papilio dardanus Brown, 1776
Papilio phorcas congoanus Rothschild, 1896
Papilio filaprae Suffert, 1904
Papilio mechowi Dewitz, 1881
Papilio mechowianus Dewitz, 1885
Papilio echerioides homeyeri Plötz, 1880
Papilio lormieri Distant, 1874
Papilio chitondensis Bivar de Sousa & Fernandes, 1966
Papilio mackinnoni benguellae Jordan, 1908

Leptocercini
Graphium antheus (Cramer, 1779)
Graphium policenes (Cramer, 1775)
Graphium junodi (Trimen, 1893)
Graphium porthaon (Hewitson, 1865)
Graphium angolanus (Goeze, 1779)
Graphium taboranus (Oberthür, 1886)
Graphium schaffgotschi (Niepelt, 1927)
Graphium ridleyanus (White, 1843)
Graphium leonidas (Fabricius, 1793)
Graphium tynderaeus (Fabricius, 1793)
Graphium latreillianus theorini (Aurivillius, 1881)
Graphium almansor (Honrath, 1884)
Graphium ucalegonides (Staudinger, 1884)
Graphium poggianus (Honrath, 1884)
Graphium hachei (Dewitz, 1881)
Graphium ucalegon (Hewitson, 1865)

Pieridae

Pseudopontiinae
Pseudopontia paradoxa (Felder & Felder, 1869)

Coliadinae
Eurema regularis (Butler, 1876)
Eurema hecabe solifera (Butler, 1875)
Catopsilia florella (Fabricius, 1775)
Colias electo hecate Strecker, 1905

Pierinae
Colotis antevippe gavisa (Wallengren, 1857)
Colotis celimene pholoe (Wallengren, 1860)
Colotis danae walkeri (Butler, 1884)
Colotis doubledayi (Hopffer, 1862)
Colotis euippe (Linnaeus, 1758)
Colotis regina (Trimen, 1863)
Eronia cleodora Hübner, 1823
Eronia leda (Boisduval, 1847)
Pinacopterix eriphia (Godart, [1819])
Nepheronia argia (Fabricius, 1775)
Nepheronia pharis (Boisduval, 1836)
Nepheronia thalassina verulanus (Ward, 1871)
Leptosia alcesta (Stoll, [1782])
Leptosia hybrida Bernardi, 1952
Leptosia nupta (Butler, 1873)

Pierini
Appias epaphia (Cramer, [1779])
Appias perlucens (Butler, 1898)
Appias sabina (Felder & Felder, [1865])
Mylothris agathina (Cramer, 1779)
Mylothris asphodelus Butler, 1888
Mylothris elodina diva Berger, 1954
Mylothris rembina (Plötz, 1880)
Mylothris rhodope (Fabricius, 1775)
Mylothris rueppellii rhodesiana Riley, 1921
Mylothris spica gabela Berger, 1979
Dixeia capricornus falkensteinii (Dewitz, 1879)
Dixeia pigea (Boisduval, 1836)
Belenois aurota (Fabricius, 1793)
Belenois calypso dentigera Butler, 1888
Belenois calypso crawshayi Butler, 1894
Belenois rubrosignata (Weymer, 1901)
Belenois solilucis Butler, 1874
Belenois theuszi (Dewitz, 1889)
Belenois thysa meldolae Butler, 1872
Belenois welwitschii Rogenhofer, 1890

Lycaenidae

Miletinae

Liphyrini
Euliphyra mirifica Holland, 1890
Aslauga marshalli Butler, 1899

Miletini
Megalopalpus zymna (Westwood, 1851)
Lachnocnema bibulus (Fabricius, 1793)
Lachnocnema laches (Fabricius, 1793)
Lachnocnema intermedia Libert, 1996
Lachnocnema angolanus Libert, 1996
Lachnocnema emperamus (Snellen, 1872)
Lachnocnema regularis Libert, 1996
Lachnocnema bamptoni Libert, 1996

Poritiinae

Liptenini
Alaena amazoula congoana Aurivillius, 1914
Alaena rosei Vane-Wright, 1980
Pentila amenaida Hewitson, 1873
Pentila pauli benguellana Stempffer & Bennett, 1961
Pentila tachyroides Dewitz, 1879
Telipna albofasciata Aurivillius, 1910
Telipna cuypersi Libert, 2005
Telipna acraeoides (Grose-Smith & Kirby, 1890)
Telipna sanguinea (Plötz, 1880)
Telipna nyanza katangae Stempffer, 1961
Ornipholidotos ugandae goodi Libert, 2000
Ornipholidotos gabonensis Stempffer, 1947
Ornipholidotos sylphida (Staudinger, 1892)
Liptena homeyeri homeyeri Dewitz, 1884
Liptena homeyeri straminea Stempffer, Bennett & May, 1974
Liptena undularis Hewitson, 1866
Liptena xanthostola xantha (Grose-Smith, 1901)
Tetrarhanis ilma (Hewitson, 1873)
Falcuna hollandi (Aurivillius, 1899)
Falcuna lacteata Stempffer & Bennett, 1963
Falcuna libyssa angolensis Stempffer & Bennett, 1963
Falcuna synesia (Hulstaert, 1924)
Larinopoda lircaea (Hewitson, 1866)
Larinopoda tera (Hewitson, 1873)
Eresiomera osheba (Holland, 1890)
Cnodontes vansomereni Stempffer & Bennett, 1953

Epitolini
Epitola urania Kirby, 1887
Cerautola ceraunia (Hewitson, 1873)
Cerautola crowleyi leucographa Libert, 1999
Cerautola miranda vidua (Talbot, 1935)
Stempfferia cercene (Hewitson, 1873)
Stempfferia michelae centralis Libert, 1999
Deloneura barca (Grose-Smith, 1901)
Epitolina dispar (Kirby, 1887)
Epitolina melissa (Druce, 1888)
Hypophytala hyetta (Hewitson, 1873)
Hewitsonia kirbyi Dewitz, 1879

Aphnaeinae
Pseudaletis agrippina Druce, 1888
Cigaritis homeyeri (Dewitz, 1887)
Cigaritis modestus (Trimen, 1891)
Cigaritis trimeni congolanus (Dufrane, 1954)
Zeritis krystyna d'Abrera, 1980
Zeritis sorhagenii (Dewitz, 1879)
Axiocerses tjoane (Wallengren, 1857)
Axiocerses amanga amanga (Westwood, 1881)
Axiocerses amanga baumi Weymer, 1901
Aloeides angolensis Tite & Dickson, 1973
Erikssonia acraeina Trimen, 1891
Aphnaeus erikssoni Trimen, 1891
Aphnaeus orcas (Drury, 1782)

Theclinae
Myrina silenus (Fabricius, 1775)
Dapidodigma demeter nuptus Clench, 1961
Hypolycaena antifaunus (Westwood, 1851)
Hypolycaena naara Hewitson, 1873
Hemiolaus caeculus (Hopffer, 1855)
Iolaus iasis Hewitson, 1865
Iolaus violacea (Riley, 1928)
Iolaus pallene (Wallengren, 1857)
Iolaus trimeni Wallengren, 1875
Iolaus parasilanus mabillei (Riley, 1928)
Iolaus iturensis (Joicey & Talbot, 1921)
Iolaus timon (Fabricius, 1787)
Stugeta bowkeri maria Suffert, 1904
Pilodeudorix mera (Hewitson, 1873)
Pilodeudorix deritas (Hewitson, 1874)
Pilodeudorix pseudoderitas (Stempffer, 1964)
Paradeudorix cobaltina (Stempffer, 1964)
Paradeudorix petersi (Stempffer & Bennett, 1956)
Deudorix nicephora Hulstaert, 1924
Capys connexivus Butler, 1897

Polyommatinae

Lycaenesthini
Anthene alberta (Bethune-Baker, 1910)
Anthene contrastata mashuna (Stevenson, 1937)
Anthene flavomaculatus (Grose-Smith & Kirby, 1893)
Anthene lachares (Hewitson, 1878)
Anthene ligures (Hewitson, 1874)
Anthene liodes (Hewitson, 1874)
Anthene lunulata (Trimen, 1894)
Anthene nigropunctata (Bethune-Baker, 1910)
Anthene rubricinctus anadema (Druce, 1905)
Anthene lyzanius (Hewitson, 1874)
Anthene lusones (Hewitson, 1874)
Anthene lacides (Hewitson, 1874)
Anthene lucretilis (Hewitson, 1874)
Cupidesthes vidua Talbot, 1929

Polyommatini
Cupidopsis cissus extensa Libert, 2003
Cupidopsis jobates (Hopffer, 1855)
Pseudonacaduba aethiops (Mabille, 1877)
Uranothauma falkensteini (Dewitz, 1879)
Uranothauma heritsia (Hewitson, 1876)
Uranothauma poggei (Dewitz, 1879)
Phlyaria cyara (Hewitson, 1876)
Tuxentius calice (Hopffer, 1855)
Tuxentius carana (Hewitson, 1876)
Tuxentius margaritaceus (Sharpe, 1892)
Tarucus sybaris linearis (Aurivillius, 1924)
Zintha hintza krooni (Dickson, 1973)
Azanus isis (Drury, 1773)
Eicochrysops eicotrochilus Bethune-Baker, 1924
Oboronia guessfeldti (Dewitz, 1879)
Oboronia pseudopunctatus (Strand, 1912)
Oboronia punctatus (Dewitz, 1879)
Lepidochrysops ansorgei Tite, 1959
Lepidochrysops chloauges (Bethune-Baker, [1923])
Lepidochrysops flavisquamosa Tite, 1959
Lepidochrysops fulvescens Tite, 1961
Lepidochrysops glauca (Trimen & Bowker, 1887)
Lepidochrysops hawkeri (Talbot, 1929)
Lepidochrysops loveni (Aurivillius, 1922)
Lepidochrysops nacrescens Tite, 1961
Lepidochrysops reichenowii (Dewitz, 1879)

Riodinidae

Nemeobiinae
Abisara tantalus caerulea Carpenter & Jackson, 1950
Abisara intermedia Aurivillius, 1895
Abisara caeca semicaeca Riley, 1932
Abisara dewitzi Aurivillius, 1898
Abisara rogersi Druce, 1878

Nymphalidae

Libytheinae
Libythea labdaca labdaca Westwood, 1851
Libythea labdaca laius Trimen, 1879

Danainae

Danaini
Danaus chrysippus orientis (Aurivillius, 1909)
Tirumala petiverana (Doubleday, 1847)
Amauris niavius (Linnaeus, 1758)
Amauris crawshayi angola Bethune-Baker, 1914
Amauris dannfelti Aurivillius, 1891
Amauris hecate (Butler, 1866)
Amauris hyalites Butler, 1874

Satyrinae

Elymniini
Elymniopsis bammakoo (Westwood, [1851])

Melanitini
Gnophodes betsimena parmeno Doubleday, 1849
Gnophodes chelys (Fabricius, 1793)

Satyrini
Bicyclus angulosa selousi (Trimen, 1895)
Bicyclus anynana centralis Condamin, 1968
Bicyclus buea (Strand, 1912)
Bicyclus campus (Karsch, 1893)
Bicyclus cottrelli (van Son, 1952)
Bicyclus dorothea (Cramer, 1779)
Bicyclus iccius (Hewitson, 1865)
Bicyclus istaris (Plötz, 1880)
Bicyclus lamani (Aurivillius, 1900)
Bicyclus mandanes Hewitson, 1873
Bicyclus moyses Condamin & Fox, 1964
Bicyclus nachtetis Condamin, 1965
Bicyclus martius sanaos (Hewitson, 1866)
Bicyclus sandace (Hewitson, 1877)
Bicyclus saussurei (Dewitz, 1879)
Bicyclus sebetus (Hewitson, 1877)
Bicyclus smithi (Aurivillius, 1899)
Bicyclus suffusa (Riley, 1921)
Bicyclus technatis (Hewitson, 1877)
Bicyclus vansoni Condamin, 1965
Bicyclus vulgaris (Butler, 1868)
Hallelesis asochis congoensis (Joicey & Talbot, 1921)
Heteropsis angolensis (Kielland, 1994)
Heteropsis centralis (Aurivillius, 1903)
Heteropsis eliasis (Hewitson, 1866)
Heteropsis ochracea (Lathy, 1906)
Heteropsis phaea (Karsch, 1894)
Ypthima asterope hereroica van Son, 1955
Ypthima condamini Kielland, 1982
Ypthima congoana Overlaet, 1955
Ypthima doleta Kirby, 1880
Ypthima impura Elwes & Edwards, 1893
Ypthima praestans Overlaet, 1954
Ypthima pulchra Overlaet, 1954
Ypthima recta Overlaet, 1955
Mashuna upemba (Overlaet, 1955)
Neocoenyra cooksoni Druce, 1907

Charaxinae

Charaxini
Charaxes varanes vologeses (Mabille, 1876)
Charaxes protoclea protonothodes van Someren, 1971
Charaxes boueti carvalhoi Bivar de Sousa, 1983
Charaxes macclounii Butler, 1895
Charaxes lucretius saldanhai Bivar de Sousa, 1983
Charaxes jasius brunnescens Poulton, 1926
Charaxes jasius saturnus Butler, 1866
Charaxes castor (Cramer, 1775)
Charaxes brutus angustus Rothschild, 1900
Charaxes brutus natalensis Staudinger, 1885
Charaxes pollux (Cramer, 1775)
Charaxes druceanus proximans Joicey & Talbot, 1922
Charaxes eudoxus mechowi Rothschild, 1900
Charaxes numenes aequatorialis van Someren, 1972
Charaxes tiridates tiridatinus Röber, 1936
Charaxes bohemani Felder & Felder, 1859
Charaxes smaragdalis leopoldi Ghesquiére, 1933
Charaxes pythodoris Hewitson, 1873
Charaxes zingha (Stoll, 1780)
Charaxes etesipe (Godart, 1824)
Charaxes penricei penricei Rothschild, 1900
Charaxes penricei dealbata van Someren, 1966
Charaxes achaemenes Felder & Felder, 1867
Charaxes jahlusa argynnides Westwood, 1864
Charaxes eupale latimargo Joicey & Talbot, 1921
Charaxes dilutus Rothschild, 1898
Charaxes anticlea proadusta van Someren, 1971
Charaxes hildebrandti (Dewitz, 1879)
Charaxes etheocles ochracea van Someren & Jackson, 1957
Charaxes cedreatis Hewitson, 1874
Charaxes howarthi Minig, 1976
Charaxes fulgurata Aurivillius, 1899
Charaxes loandae van Someren, 1969
Charaxes brainei van Son, 1966
Charaxes guderiana (Dewitz, 1879)
Charaxes pleione congoensis Plantrou, 1989
Charaxes paphianus Ward, 1871
Charaxes kahldeni Homeyer & Dewitz, 1882
Charaxes zoolina ehmckei Homeyer & Dewitz, 1882
Charaxes nichetes Grose-Smith, 1883
Charaxes lycurgus bernardiana Plantrou, 1978
Charaxes zelica rougeoti Plantrou, 1978

Euxanthini
Charaxes eurinome ansellica (Butler, 1870)
Charaxes trajanus (Ward, 1871)

Pallini
Palla decius (Cramer, 1777)
Palla violinitens coniger (Butler, 1896)

Apaturinae
Apaturopsis cleochares (Hewitson, 1873)

Nymphalinae

Nymphalini
Antanartia delius (Drury, 1782)
Junonia artaxia Hewitson, 1864
Junonia natalica angolensis (Rothschild, 1918)
Junonia sophia infracta Butler, 1888
Junonia stygia (Aurivillius, 1894)
Junonia terea elgiva Hewitson, 1864
Junonia cymodoce lugens (Schultze, 1912)
Salamis cacta (Fabricius, 1793)
Protogoniomorpha anacardii ansorgei (Rothschild, 1904)
Protogoniomorpha parhassus (Drury, 1782)
Protogoniomorpha temora (Felder & Felder, 1867)
Precis actia Distant, 1880
Precis archesia (Cramer, 1779)
Precis ceryne (Boisduval, 1847)
Precis coelestina Dewitz, 1879
Precis octavia sesamus Trimen, 1883
Precis pelarga (Fabricius, 1775)
Hypolimnas anthedon (Doubleday, 1845)
Hypolimnas dinarcha (Hewitson, 1865)
Hypolimnas misippus (Linnaeus, 1764)
Hypolimnas monteironis (Druce, 1874)
Hypolimnas salmacis (Drury, 1773)

Cyrestinae

Cyrestini
Cyrestis camillus (Fabricius, 1781)

Biblidinae

Biblidini
Byblia anvatara crameri Aurivillius, 1894
Mesoxantha ethosea ethoseoides Rebel, 1914
Ariadne enotrea archeri Carcasson, 1958
Neptidopsis ophione nucleata Grünberg, 1911
Eurytela dryope angulata Aurivillius, 1899
Eurytela hiarbas (Drury, 1782)

Epicaliini
Sevenia amulia intermedia (Carcasson, 1961)
Sevenia amulia benguelae (Chapman, 1872)
Sevenia consors (Rothschild & Jordan, 1903)
Sevenia occidentalium penricei (Rothschild & Jordan, 1903)
Sevenia pechueli (Dewitz, 1879)
Sevenia trimeni (Aurivillius, 1899)

Limenitinae

Limenitidini
Harma theobene superna (Fox, 1968)
Cymothoe beckeri (Herrich-Schaeffer, 1858)
Cymothoe caenis (Drury, 1773)
Cymothoe excelsa deltoides Overlaet, 1944
Cymothoe hypatha (Hewitson, 1866)
Cymothoe lurida hesione Weymer, 1907
Cymothoe sangaris (Godart, 1824)
Pseudoneptis bugandensis ianthe Hemming, 1964
Pseudacraea boisduvalii (Doubleday, 1845)
Pseudacraea dolomena (Hewitson, 1865)
Pseudacraea eurytus (Linnaeus, 1758)
Pseudacraea kuenowii gottbergi Dewitz, 1884
Pseudacraea lucretia protracta (Butler, 1874)
Pseudacraea poggei (Dewitz, 1879)
Pseudacraea semire (Cramer, 1779)

Neptidini
Neptis gratiosa Overlaet, 1955
Neptis jordani Neave, 1910
Neptis melicerta (Drury, 1773)
Neptis morosa Overlaet, 1955
Neptis nebrodes Hewitson, 1874
Neptis nemetes margueriteae Fox, 1968
Neptis nicomedes Hewitson, 1874
Neptis quintilla Mabille, 1890
Neptis nicoteles Hewitson, 1874
Neptis nysiades Hewitson, 1868

Adoliadini
Catuna crithea (Drury, 1773)
Euryphura concordia (Hopffer, 1855)
Pseudargynnis hegemone (Godart, 1819)
Aterica galene extensa Heron, 1909
Cynandra opis bernardii Lagnel, 1967
Euriphene barombina (Aurivillius, 1894)
Euriphene gambiae gabonica Bernardi, 1966
Euriphene iris (Aurivillius, 1903)
Euriphene plagiata (Aurivillius, 1897)
Euriphene saphirina trioculata (Talbot, 1927)
Bebearia oxione squalida (Talbot, 1928)
Bebearia guineensis (Felder & Felder, 1867)
Bebearia cocalia katera (van Someren, 1939)
Bebearia sophus (Fabricius, 1793)
Bebearia plistonax (Hewitson, 1874)
Bebearia hassoni Hecq, 1998
Euphaedra medon celestis Hecq, 1986
Euphaedra zaddachii Dewitz, 1879
Euphaedra morini Hecq, 1983
Euphaedra permixtum (Butler, 1873)
Euphaedra fontainei Hecq, 1977
Euphaedra preussi Staudinger, 1891
Euphaedra eleus (Drury, 1782)
Euphaedra coprates (Druce, 1875)
Euphaedra ruspina (Hewitson, 1865)
Euphaedra harpalyce spatiosa (Mabille, 1876)
Euphaedra losinga wardi (Druce, 1874)
Euptera mocquerysi Staudinger, 1893

Heliconiinae

Acraeini
Acraea admatha Hewitson, 1865
Acraea anemosa Hewitson, 1865
Acraea camaena (Drury, 1773)
Acraea endoscota Le Doux, 1928
Acraea eugenia Karsch, 1893
Acraea leucographa Ribbe, 1889
Acraea neobule Doubleday, 1847
Acraea pseudolycia pseudolycia Butler, 1874
Acraea pseudolycia astrigera Butler, 1899
Acraea quirina (Fabricius, 1781)
Acraea zetes (Linnaeus, 1758)
Acraea acrita ambigua Trimen, 1891
Acraea asema Hewitson, 1877
Acraea atolmis Westwood, 1881
Acraea bailundensis Wichgraf, 1918
Acraea bellona Weymer, 1908
Acraea cepheus (Linnaeus, 1758)
Acraea diogenes Suffert, 1904
Acraea egina (Cramer, 1775)
Acraea guillemei Oberthür, 1893
Acraea lapidorum Pierre, 1988
Acraea omrora Trimen, 1894
Acraea onerata Trimen, 1891
Acraea periphanes Oberthür, 1893
Acraea violarum Boisduval, 1847
Acraea atergatis Westwood, 1881
Acraea buettneri Rogenhofer, 1890
Acraea caldarena Hewitson, 1877
Acraea ella Eltringham, 1911
Acraea lygus Druce, 1875
Acraea pseudegina Westwood, 1852
Acraea pudorella Aurivillius, 1899
Acraea rogersi Hewitson, 1873
Acraea consanguinea (Aurivillius, 1899)
Acraea epaea (Cramer, 1779)
Acraea leopoldina (Aurivillius, 1895)
Acraea poggei Dewitz, 1879
Acraea pseuderyta Godman & Salvin, 1890
Acraea umbra macarioides (Aurivillius, 1893)
Acraea acerata Hewitson, 1874
Acraea bonasia (Fabricius, 1775)
Acraea circeis (Drury, 1782)
Acraea encedana Pierre, 1976
Acraea serena (Fabricius, 1775)
Acraea esebria Hewitson, 1861
Acraea jodutta (Fabricius, 1793)
Acraea lycoa Godart, 1819
Acraea orestia Hewitson, 1874
Acraea peneleos pelasgius Grose-Smith, 1900
Acraea pentapolis Ward, 1871
Acraea pharsalus Ward, 1871
Acraea karschi Aurivillius, 1899
Acraea uvui balina Karsch, 1892
Acraea ventura Hewitson, 1877
Acraea viviana Staudinger, 1896
Acraea mirifica Lathy, 1906
Acraea rahira Boisduval, 1833
Acraea speciosa Wichgraf, 1909
Acraea oreas angolanus Lathy, 1906
Acraea parrhasia servona Godart, 1819
Acraea perenna Doubleday, 1847

Vagrantini
Lachnoptera anticlia (Hübner, 1819)
Phalanta eurytis (Doubleday, 1847)
Phalanta phalantha aethiopica (Rothschild & Jordan, 1903)

Hesperiidae

Coeliadinae
Coeliades bixana Evans, 1940
Coeliades chalybe (Westwood, 1852)
Coeliades forestan (Stoll, [1782])
Coeliades hanno (Plötz, 1879)
Coeliades libeon (Druce, 1875)
Coeliades pisistratus (Fabricius, 1793)
Pyrrhochalcia iphis (Drury, 1773)

Pyrginae

Celaenorrhinini
Loxolexis hollandi (Druce, 1909)
Celaenorrhinus homeyeri (Plötz, 1880)
Eretis herewardi rotundimacula Evans, 1937
Eretis lugens (Rogenhofer, 1891)
Eretis melania Mabille, 1891
Sarangesa bouvieri (Mabille, 1877)
Sarangesa motozi (Wallengren, 1857)
Sarangesa pandaensis Joicey & Talbot, 1921
Sarangesa seineri Strand, 1909

Tagiadini
Tagiades flesus (Fabricius, 1781)
Eagris hereus (Druce, 1875)
Eagris lucetia (Hewitson, 1875)
Eagris tigris liberti Collins & Larsen, 2005
Calleagris hollandi (Butler, 1897)
Calleagris jamesoni ansorgei Evans, 1951
Caprona cassualalla Bethune-Baker, 1911
Abantis contigua Evans, 1937
Abantis tettensis Hopffer, 1855
Abantis vidua Weymer, 1901

Carcharodini
Spialia colotes (Druce, 1875)
Spialia delagoae (Trimen, 1898)
Spialia ploetzi (Aurivillius, 1891)
Spialia secessus (Trimen, 1891)

Hesperiinae

Aeromachini
Astictopterus abjecta (Snellen, 1872)
Kedestes brunneostriga (Plötz, 1884)
Kedestes callicles (Hewitson, 1868)
Kedestes lema Neave, 1910
Kedestes nerva paola Plötz, 1884
Kedestes protensa Butler, 1901
Gorgyra diversata Evans, 1937
Gorgyra mocquerysii Holland, 1896
Teniorhinus harona (Westwood, 1881)
Ceratrichia punctata Holland, 1896
Pardaleodes incerta (Snellen, 1872)
Pardaleodes sator pusiella Mabille, 1877
Pardaleodes tibullus (Fabricius, 1793)
Acada biseriata (Mabille, 1893)
Osmodes thora (Plötz, 1884)
Parosmodes lentiginosa (Holland, 1896)
Parosmodes morantii (Trimen, 1873)
Meza cybeutes (Holland, 1894)
Meza indusiata (Mabille, 1891)
Meza meza (Hewitson, 1877)
Paronymus budonga (Evans, 1938)
Andronymus caesar (Fabricius, 1793)
Andronymus helles Evans, 1937
Andronymus hero Evans, 1937
Andronymus neander (Plötz, 1884)
Chondrolepis niveicornis (Plötz, 1883)
Zophopetes cerymica (Hewitson, 1867)
Gretna cylinda (Hewitson, 1876)
Pteroteinon laufella (Hewitson, 1868)
Leona maracanda (Hewitson, 1876)
Caenides dacela (Hewitson, 1876)
Monza cretacea (Snellen, 1872)
Fresna nyassae (Hewitson, 1878)
Platylesches batangae (Holland, 1894)

Baorini
Brusa allardi Berger, 1967
Borbo fanta (Evans, 1937)
Borbo holtzi (Plötz, 1883)
Borbo micans (Holland, 1896)

Heteropterinae
Metisella angolana (Karsch, 1896)
Metisella meninx (Trimen, 1873)
Lepella lepeletier (Latreille, 1824)

See also
Geography of Angola
Angolan Scarp savanna and woodlands, the steep coastal escarpment.
Angolan montane forest-grassland mosaic, the inland slopes of the central highlands which are covered in grassland and contain the remaining patches of mountain woodland;
Angolan miombo woodlands, much of the large inland plain, indeed most of central Angola.
Angolan mopane woodlands, an area in the south, mostly comprising Cunene Province and extending across the border into neighbouring Namibia.

References

Seitz, A. Die Gross-Schmetterlinge der Erde 13: Die Afrikanischen Tagfalter. Plates
Seitz, A. Die Gross-Schmetterlinge der Erde 13: Die Afrikanischen Tagfalter. Text (in German)

Angola
List
Butterflies
Angola
Angola